Andrea Bertolini (born 1 December 1973, in Sassuolo) is an Italian professional racing driver currently driving for AF Corse in the FIA World Endurance Championship. He is the official test driver of the Maserati factory.
Bertolini began racing at a young age, working as the youngest ever test driver for Ferrari at 19, followed by work in the experimental and development department. He also participated in the development of the Maserati MC12, in which he has enjoyed racing success winning for three times the FIA GT Championship in GT1 class, and also claiming the first edition of the FIA GT1 World Championship. He won the WEC championship in GTE Am category in 2015 and in the same year he won the 24H of Le Mans in the same class.

Racing history

Andrea Bertolini began racing karts at age 11. He came second in the Italian Championship, won championships at a national level, and went on to win the CIAK Cup and place second in the Italian 125 Championship in 2000. In 2001 he drove a Porsche 996 GT3-R for Art Engineering in the GT3 division of the FIA GT.  In 2002 he moved to JMB Racing driving a Ferrari 360 Modena and continued through 2003 finishing 4th.

In 2004 he moved to the Giesse Squadra Corse team, again driving a 360 Modena. Once again, he placed 2nd overall, and was awarded the "Driver Performance of the Year". Part way through 2004, he was offered a position on the Maserati AF Corse team driving their new, GT1 class Maserati MC12, a car he had been involved in developing. He accepted, winning two races that year at Oschersleben, Germany and Zhuhai, China with his teammate, former Formula One driver, Mika Salo.

In 2005 he returned to JMB Racing, again driving an MC12. He finished the season tied 4th (with teammate Karl Wendlinger), within 4 points of first.

Andrea Bertolini also raced his MC12 in the American Le Mans Series (ALMS) in 2005 but without much success. He made no podium finishes and crashed out in the race at Mazda Raceway Laguna Seca.

For 2006 in the FIA GT, Bertolini moved to Vitaphone Racing Team where he again raced the MC12, with teammate Michael Bartels. Bartels and Bertolini finished first in the overall driver standings, and also their team to a 1st-place finish in the team standings.

Bertolini and Bartels also won the championship again driving the same Vitaphone Maserati in 2008, 2009 and 2010.

In 2011 he won the International Superstars Series driving a Maserati Quattroporte for Swiss Team.

Bertolini became the first person to drive Ferrari's new F1 Simulator at an opening ceremony held at the Italian teams' Maranello base.

For 2012, Bertolini will compete in the FIA World Endurance Championship, driving an AF Corse Ferrari 458 Italia GT2 with Olivier Beretta.

See also
Ferrari 360 Modena
FIA GT
Maserati MC12
Porsche 996

Racing record

Complete GT1 World Championship results

Complete FIA World Endurance Championship results

‡ As Bertolini was a guest driver, he was ineligible for championship points.

24 Hours of Le Mans results

Complete WeatherTech SportsCar Championship results
(key) (Races in bold indicate pole position) (Races in italics indicate fastest lap)

† Bertolini did not complete sufficient laps in order to score full points.

Complete European Le Mans Series results

Complete GT World Challenge Europe Sprint Cup results
(key) (Races in bold indicate pole position) (Races in italics indicate fastest lap)

References
http://www.andreabertolini.it/

1973 births
Living people
People from Sassuolo
Italian racing drivers
FIA GT Championship drivers
American Le Mans Series drivers
FIA GT1 World Championship drivers
24 Hours of Daytona drivers
Rolex Sports Car Series drivers
24 Hours of Le Mans drivers
Superstars Series drivers
FIA World Endurance Championship drivers
Blancpain Endurance Series drivers
WeatherTech SportsCar Championship drivers
European Le Mans Series drivers
24 Hours of Spa drivers
Asian Le Mans Series drivers
International GT Open drivers
Sportspeople from the Province of Modena
AF Corse drivers
SMP Racing drivers
Eurasia Motorsport drivers
Ferrari Competizioni GT drivers